Kate Ceberano and Friends is an album by Kate Ceberano released through Mushroom Records in 1994.

Background
The album was made up of musical selections from the 1993 ABC TV series Kate Ceberano & Friends. The album was a commercial success, charting in the top 20 in Ceberano's native Australia.

Track listing

 "Patsy Cline Medley" is made up of three songs; "I Fall to Pieces", "Walkin' After Midnight" and "Crazy"

Charts
Kate Ceberano and Friends debuted at number 31, before reaching a peak of number 19 in Australia in February 1994.

Certification

References

Kate Ceberano albums
1994 live albums
Mushroom Records live albums